Biggio is a surname. Notable people with the surname include:

Cavan Biggio (born 1995), American baseball player
Craig Biggio (born 1965), American baseball player
Piero Biggio (1937–2007), Italian Roman Catholic prelate

Italian-language surnames